Terry Waxman (born December 28, 1956) is an American politician who has served in the West Virginia House of Delegates from the 48th district since 2018. She previously served in the West Virginia House of Delegates from 2014 to 2016.

References

1956 births
Living people
Republican Party members of the West Virginia House of Delegates
21st-century American politicians